WKIK can refer to:

 WKIK (AM), a radio station (1560 AM) licensed to La Plata, Maryland, United States
 WKIK-FM, a radio station (102.9 FM) licensed to California, Maryland, United States